Castle of Belmonte may refer to:

 Castle of Belmonte (Belmonte), medieval castle located in  Belmonte, Portugal
 Castle of Belmonte (Cuenca), medieval castle in Cuenca, Spain